The 1989 Indiana Hoosiers football team represented Indiana University Bloomington as a member of the Big Ten Conference during the 1989 NCAA Division I-A football season. Led by sixth-year head coach Bill Mallory, the Hoosiers compiled an overall record of 5–6 with a mark of 3–5 in conference play, tying for sixth place the Big Ten. It was Indiana's first losing season since 1985. The team played home games at Memorial Stadium in Bloomington, Indiana. 

In the battle for the Old Oaken Bucket, Purdue beat Indiana.

Schedule

Personnel

Season summary

at Kentucky

Missouri

Toledo

Northwestern

at Ohio State

Minnesota

at Michigan

Michigan State
Anthony Thompson scores his 60th career touchdown to set a then NCAA Division I-A record.

at Wisconsin
The NCAA single-game rushing record of 357 yards, held by Rueben Mayes and Mike Pringle is broken as Anthony Thompson rushes for 377 yards in a 45-17 victory at Wisconsin. This stood as a Big Ten Conference record for 25 years until it was broken by Melvin Gordon (Wisconsin) in 2014.  , it still stands as the school record.    Thompson also scores four touchdowns on the day.

at Illinois

Purdue

Larry Sullivan kicked a 32-yard field goal with 2:51 left and Scott Bonnell missed a 26-yard field goal for Indiana with 1:29 remaining. 
 The loss knocked the Hoosiers out of playing in the Freedom Bowl while others speculated it may have also contributed to Anthony Thompson not winning the Heisman Trophy.

Highlights
Nov. 24, 1989: Anthony Thompson was the top vote-getter and the only repeat selection on the 1989 Walter Camp All-America team. Thompson finished the season with 1,793 yards and 24 touchdowns.
Dec. 2, 1989: A chorus of boos is heard throughout the Hoosier Dome during the Indiana-Kentucky basketball game. It is announced that Andre Ware of the Houston Cougars is the 55th recipient of the Heisman Trophy. Anthony Thompson finishes second.

1990 NFL draftees

Trent Green joined the NFL in 1997 with the Washington Redskins.

Awards and honors
Anthony Thompson, Big Ten Player of the Year
Anthony Thompson, Chicago Tribune Silver Football
Anthony Thompson, Walter Camp Award
Anthony Thompson, Maxwell Award

References

Indiana
Indiana Hoosiers football seasons
Indiana Hoosiers football